Le Change  is a former commune in the Dordogne department in Nouvelle-Aquitaine in southwestern France. On 1 January 2017, it was merged into the new commune Bassillac et Auberoche.

Population

Gallery

See also
Communes of the Dordogne department

References

Former communes of Dordogne
Dordogne communes articles needing translation from French Wikipedia